The Academy of Allied Health and Science (AAHS), established in 1996, is a small magnet public high school located in Neptune Township, in Monmouth County, New Jersey, United States. The school is one of five career academies offered by the Monmouth County Vocational School District. The school focuses on medical education for teenagers who want to pursue medical careers. Proximity to Jersey Shore University Medical Center provides students with hands-on training in a hospital setting. The school has been accredited by the Middle States Association of Colleges and Schools Commission on Elementary and Secondary Schools since 1999.

The school selectively admits students from Monmouth County, accepting about 70-75 per year.  All classes taken by students within the school are accelerated, honors-level classes. Students who attend this school tend to score in high percentiles on most standardized tests and the SAT, and nearly always attend four-year colleges (usually 98-100%).

As of the 2021–22 school year, the school had an enrollment of 301 students and 23.5 classroom teachers (on an FTE basis), for a student–teacher ratio of 12.8:1. There were 3 students (1.0% of enrollment) eligible for free lunch and 1 (0.3% of students) eligible for reduced-cost lunch.

The school has been recognized by the United States Department of Education with Blue Ribbon School award three times; 2002, 2007 and 2018.

Admission criteria 
The academy is a selective school and will only take those who score well on 7th and 1st marking period 8th grade report cards, and on an acceptance exam, normally held in January or February, after applications to school are submitted. To take Geometry in the freshman year, students successfully pass an Algebra I test. To take Spanish II in the freshman year, students must successfully pass Spanish I test, which includes an "interview". The different parts of the entrance exam (not including the Algebra I and Spanish II test) sum up a cumulative score. If this is below 75/100, then the student is automatically disqualified from attending, but a 75 might not be enough to pass. Each town has its first highest-ranked student admitted by default assuming the student earned a 75 or higher. Not all towns have one student apply, usually one or more seek admission to the Monmouth County Full-Time Vocational Schools. All other students are chosen based on rank and test admission score. There is also a waiting list. It is used when students decline their admission.

Schedule
The school uses a block schedule. There are four classes in a day, and periods are an hour and twenty-five minutes long. School begins at 7:35 am and ends at 2:25 pm. The first four to five classes are taken in the first half of the school year, and the next four to five are taken in the second. Some classes, including electives, alternate with Fitness.

The first two periods take place from 7:35 am – 10:27 am (with a two-minute break in between periods).  From 10:27 am – 11:27 am there is a one-hour activity period, where students eat lunch, participate in clubs, or overall relax.  From 11:27 am – 2:25 pm the final two periods take place.

Curriculum

Freshman year 

The following classes are required during freshman year: Dynamics of Healthcare, Computer Applications, Math (Algebra I or Geometry), Foreign Language (Latin I or Spanish I or II), Biology, Intro to Anatomy and Physiology (Allied Health Clinical Skills), World History, Fitness I and English I. There are nine required classes total: Algebra I or Geometry, English I, World History, Allied Health Clinical Skills, Dynamics of Healthcare, Latin I or Spanish I/II, Computer Applications, Biology I, and Fitness I.  There are no electives in freshman year. The "Dynamics of Healthcare" course incorporates learning about health insurance, legal terms, healthcare facilities, professional behavior, and medical history. The course is extremely demanding and takes up most of the students time, as it is affiliated with Rutgers. The "Financial Literacy" course has been replaced with "Allied Health Clinical Skills," which addresses (as indicated by its name) the clinical side of the healthcare profession.  This switch took place in 2013 and Financial Literacy has been moved to Junior Year.

Note: Since the 2012–2013 school year, students are allowed to take Algebra II in 9th grade and PreCalculus in 10th grade. Rahul Yerrabelli did this and took an online AP Statistics course through FLVS for his 11th grade math credits. There is now a Statistics class taught by a new teacher for the 2018–2019 school year.

Instead of taking an art class, students must complete a "Visual & Performing Arts" assignment before November of their sophomore year.

Sophomore year 

The following classes are required during sophomore year: Anatomy and Physiology I, Math: Algebra II or Geometry, Foreign Language: Latin II or Spanish II or III, Chemistry, English II, Fitness II, Principles of Computer Technology, Healthy Relations (a guidance/sex ed course) and US History I. There are no electives in sophomore year. In Anatomy and Physiology I course, students volunteer two hours on Fridays for six weeks at Jersey Shore University Medical Center at a different department each week. Departments that can be assigned include NICU, occupational therapy, laboratory, patient transport, and various nursing floors. At the end of the Anatomy course, students take a Rutgers-issued exam for college credits in Anatomy I and Dynamics of Healthcare.

Note: Since the 2012–2013 school year, students are allowed to take Algebra II in 9th grade and PreCalculus in 10th grade.  It has not been decided if this will be standard for later years for students in the program.

Junior year 

Students have no electives in this year. During junior year, students continue their learning in Anatomy and Physiology II. Students will again take a similar college-level test for college credits for the Anatomy II course and for Medical Terminology. Students also participate in the Grant Writing/Service Learning class, which teaches students the various aspects of helping their communities. Much volunteer work is involved as the class sponsors activities such as coat or book drives.

Note: Since the 2012–2013 school year, students are allowed to take Algebra II in 9th grade and PreCalculus in 10th grade. There is only 1 junior who is in this case. He is taking an online AP Statistics course through FLVS for his 11th grade math credits. In 2018, a new Statistics teacher was hired to teach the class of about 20 juniors. The class uses an AP textbook but is not an AP class, however, students can take the AP tests by themselves with not much preparation after the course.

Other required courses are: Financial Literacy, Nutrition (Dual-Enrollment), Algebra II or Pre-calculus, English III, U.S. History II, Physics, Fitness III, and Latin II or Spanish III/IV.

Senior year 

Students take a "mentorship" course. Students choose a "mentor," and must relate their mentorship to the medical field. There are exceptions to the rule of medical involvement, as long as students can prove they are gaining valuable experience in a professional field.  Seniors go to their mentorship site three days a week (Mon, Wed, Fri) for three hours a day during the second half of the school day.  Students have worked with local medical centers, specialized private clinics (ranging from sports medicine to urology), and miscellaneous sites such as a college radio station. Notably, students can fail mentorship if they are removed out of the hospital, so it is a very formal and strict relationship.

The following medical courses are available: EMT, Physical Therapy, Sign Language, and Alternative Medicine. Other required courses include: Biology, English IV, Pre-Calculus or Calculus, and Chemistry. Foreign Language is not required, and can be replaced by an elective.  The Fitness program is also no longer an in-school class for seniors, and instead involves filling out an online set of forms.

Clubs and activities
The academy has many different clubs in many different areas. Clubs usually meet during lunch, but sometimes meet after school. Anyone can join most clubs, but some have requirements. Most notably, HOSA requires members to be juniors or seniors and officers to be seniors, NHS requires members to be juniors or seniors with a 92 (A) GPA and to do volunteer work, and Character Committee has a selection process including interviews. Every club runs year long, except Mock Trial (first semester only) and Model UN (second semester only).

Team Allied (Discontinued)
One main goal of Team Allied (formerly known as Character Committee) is to help new students at the academy feel welcome. Team Allied is unique in that it is the only club that is a four-year commitment, requiring members to sign up in the early spring of their freshmen year. Still, many apply to the club. To keep the club small, there is a highly selective process to determine which applicants are admitted which includes an interview.

Math Club
Math Club emphasizes a love of math. The club meets every second and fourth Tuesday. Math League tests are given 6 times a year and are open to all students. The tests occur during lunch and the time limit is 30 minutes for 6 questions of increasing difficulty (many finish earlier). The highest monthly and cumulative scores are recorded and compared with other schools within the MCVSD district. There is also the AMC test which only occurs once a year. This test has only started to be implemented in 2019–2020 school year.

Global Forum (Discontinued)
Global Forum is a club that focuses on free discussion. Global Forum meets every Friday at the second half of lunch. Most of meetings are debates among its members on a specific topic. These debates do not have an informal atmosphere with calling out as the main form of communication. Topics depend on current events, but frequently include gun control, military action, criticism/defense of the president's actions, etc. There also occasional fundraisers for charitable organizations like UNICEF and Red Cross. Finally, Global Forum provides a "This Day in History..." fact every Wednesday and Friday on the morning video announcements. Global Forum was discontinued before 2016.

Mock Trial
Mock Trial meets in the first semester only. Mock Trial participates, often successfully, in a tournament with other schools. The members pretend to be lawyers, witnesses, etc. and perform a trial hearing. Many members in Mock Trial are also in Model UN.

Model UN
Model UN only occurs on the second half the year. It starts just when Mock Trial ends and is run by the same teacher. Its meetings times are usually Wednesday on the second half of lunch. As the name implies, the club is about imitating a UN meeting. Each member has a country and the members debate an issue. Usually, Model UN competes in one tournament with other schools every year.

Science League
Science League was started in the 2013–2014 school year. Most of its meetings are after school. The club has a large number of competitions, including NJSL, US Biology Olympiad, US Chemistry Olympiad, Merck Test, etc. All of the tests are one day events, except for NJSL. There are four NJSL tests (January, February, March, April) every year. There are many subjects with each subject having 1-3 levels of difficulty. There are plaque for individuals who score in the highest 10% in the state in their respective subject and level. Team plaques are also given to the top 10 teams in the state for each subject and level. In the 2013–2014 school year, Science League chose to participate in four teams: Biology I, Biology II, Chemistry I, and Chemistry II. In the 2014 Biology Olympiad, 4 students, a remarkably high number, of students qualified as semifinalists. Approximately 600 high school students qualify nationwide for this. All four semifinalists were juniors. In 2018, four seniors got 7th place in the New Jersey Science League Biology I Competition. In 2019, the same four seniors and one additional one got 6th place in the New Jersey Science League Chemistry I Competition.

Academic Team
Academic Team was started in the 2018–2019 school year, and it takes place year-round. The team consists of an "A" team and a "B" team. These teams were determined by performance on multiple tryout examinations. The "A" team have received several accolades, including 3rd Place at the High Technology High School Quiz Bowl Competition, and 2nd place at the Biotechnology Quiz Bowl.

Red Cross
A branch of the Health Occupations Students of America, this club serves to primarily organize fundraisers and food drives for people in need. In the past, they have hosted successful Can Drives, Letters for Veterans, and blood drives. The club was founded by Ashlesha Thorat (Class of 2019), and the current President is Amol Shirodkar (Class of 2020).

Other clubs
Other clubs include HOSA, art club, tech club, yearbook, 4-H, pulse (started in 2013–2014 school year), and NHS.

Awards and recognition 

The Academy of Allied Health & Science has been recognized for many awards, including:

 In its listing of "America's Best High Schools 2016", the school was ranked 12th out of 500 best high schools in the country; it was ranked fifth among all high schools in New Jersey. 
 Ranked the 4th best high school in the country for STEM in 2013.
 Newsweek named the school 9th overall among the nearly 30,000 public high schools in the U.S. in their rankings of "America's Top High Schools 2015" released in August 2015; The school was ranked 6th in New Jersey.
 Blue Ribbon School, awarded by the United States Department of Education in 2001–02, 2007, and again for a third time in 2018 - the highest honor an American school can achieve.
 For the 1999–2000 school year, it was named a "Star School" by the New Jersey Department of Education, the highest honor that a New Jersey school can achieve.
 The school was recognized by Governor Jim McGreevey in 2003 as one of 25 schools selected statewide for the First Annual Governor's School of Excellence award.
 National Service Learning Leader School 1998–1999, 2005
 Intel / Scholastic School of Distinction 2005
 Ranked 74th best high school in the country in 2009 by U.S. News & World Report.
 Ranked one of 16 schools tied for first out of 381 public high schools statewide in 2011 (unchanged from the 2010) by Schooldigger.com, based on the combined percentage of students classified as proficient or above proficient on the language arts literacy (100.0%) and mathematics (100.0%) components of the High School Proficiency Assessment (HSPA).
The Asbury Park Press wrote an article following the students of the Academy of Allied Health and Science for a day.

History 

The school opened in 1996. The school's early development, including construction and curriculum creation, was overseen by Timothy M. McCorkell, who was the school's first principal until the end of the 2001–02 school year, when he was promoted to Assistant Superintendent at Monmouth County Vocational School District. He was later Superintendent in 2009. Following McCorkell was Scott Taylor. Taylor resigned after the 2004–05 school year to take a position at the Little Silver School District. Robert V. Cancro took the position after Scott Taylor left.

In 1997, the first "Color Wars" took place. Originally, two teams were made by splitting the student body into two groups by homerooms. Students were pitted against students in their own grade. It is a battle of the classes event, with the freshman and senior classes (taking the school color blue) pitted against the sophomore and junior classes (taking the school color gray) in a week-long series of competitive events, which include ultimate frisbee, pudding eating, tug of war, a medical challenge, student and faculty volleyball, an original skit, and one or more "mystery events". It takes place in late May. Beforehand, the teams must choose a team name incorporating the color. As of the  2011–12 school year, the blue team has won four times, and the gray team has won four times. In the 2011–2012 school year, the gray team won. Then the blue team won in the 2012–2013 school year against the gray team (called the Gray Avengers). Finally, in the 2013–2014 school year, the gray team (called the Holy Grayl) won against the blue team (Bluminati). Furthermore, only the class of 2022 has won all 4 years, but the classes of 2010 and 2011 came very close (each with 3-1). As of early 2017, the class of 2018 has 3 wins, and they hope to have their fourth win in spring 2018. However, the class of 2012 lost all four years. Teacher Chris Benson and the Student Council are in charge of planning and managing the events.

Starting in the 2004–05 school year, the school began phasing out its French Language program, due to core curriculum conflicts. The final French students graduated in 2008.

Following Robert Cancro's retirement at the end of the 2010–11 school year, Paul Mucciarone became principal.  He is the principal. He graduated from the US Naval Academy in 1981, and is a retired Lt. Commander of the US Navy. He served, primarily as an engineer, on several ships. He became teacher of Naval Science at the Marine Academy of Science and Technology in Sandy Hook in August 2001.

In late 2011, the principal authorized the removal of the school's web filter of Facebook.  This followed one of the sister schools removing their own filter.

Notable alumni
 Ajee' Wilson (born 1994), middle-distance runner.

Other career academies 
There are four other career academies in the Monmouth County Vocational School District. These are referred to as sister schools of the Academy of Allied Health and Science. The schools (with 2020–21 enrollment data) are:
 Biotechnology High School (BTHS) in Freehold Borough (315; 9-12)
 Communications High School (CHS) in Wall Township (306; 9-12)
 High Technology High School (HTHS) in the Lincroft section of Middletown Township (295; 9-12)
 Marine Academy of Science and Technology (MAST) in Sandy Hook in Middletown Township (283; 9-12)

References

External links 

 

Neptune Township, New Jersey
1996 establishments in New Jersey
Educational institutions established in 1996
Magnet schools in New Jersey
Middle States Commission on Secondary Schools
Public high schools in Monmouth County, New Jersey
Monmouth County Vocational School District School